Chantal Nathaly Baudaux Jiménez (born 4 January 1980) is a Venezuelan actress and model of French and Spanish descent. She debuted in 1998 in telenovela Hoy te Vi, and came to international prominence as the protagonist of telenovela La Mujer de Judas.

Personal and media life 
Chantal Baudaux was born as Chantal Nathaly Baudaux Jiménez to Spanish mother and French father. In 2008, she married Alberto Morla, a Venezuelan businessman. Baudaux was raised with no religion.

Filmography

References

External links 
  
 Chantal Baudaux at the Internet Movie Database 

1980 births
Living people
Actresses from Caracas
Venezuelan people of French descent
Venezuelan people of Spanish descent
Venezuelan female models
Venezuelan film actresses
Venezuelan telenovela actresses
Venezuelan television actresses